Podlaskie Museum of Folk Culture (until September 2016, the Bialystok Village Museum) is an open-air museum, gathering monuments of wooden architecture and ethnographic collections from the Bialystok, Lomza and Suwalki regions. Established from the merger of the Białystok Village Museum and the Ethnography Department of the Podlaskie Museum, previously it was a branch of the Museum.

The museum is located at the northern borders of Białystok, in the settlement of Wasilków, on the road to Augustów.

History
The Ethnography Department has been functioning since 1962, and the open-air museum was founded in 1982 as a branch of the then Regional Museum in Bialystok. The open-air museum was to implement projects for the protection of wooden construction in the Bialystok region created in the sixties. The author of one of the first program assumptions was prof. Ignacy Tłoczek. The project was finally approved for implementation by authorship of prof. Marian Pokropka. He assumed the reconstruction of entire settlement systems occurring in north-eastern Poland, such as: terraced house, street house, small-hamlet hamlet, camp buildings as well as manor and forest complexes.

References

External links

Museums in Podlaskie Voivodeship
Białystok County
Museums established in 1982
1982 establishments in Poland